Events in the year 2007 in Japan.

Incumbents
 Emperor – Akihito
 Prime Minister – Shinzō Abe (Liberal Democratic Party–Yamaguchi) until September 26, Yasuo Fukuda (Liberal Democratic Party–Gunma)
 Chief Cabinet Secretary: Yasuhisa Shiozaki (L–Ehime) to August 27, Kaoru Yosano (L–Tokyo) to September 26, Nobutaka Machimura (L–Hokkaidō)
 Chief Justice of the Supreme Court: Nirō Shimada
 President of the House of Representatives: Yōhei Kōno (L–Kanagawa)
 President of the House of Councillors: Chikage Ōgi (L–proportional) until July 28, Satsuki Eda (D–Okayama)
 Diet sessions: 166th (regular, January 25 to July 5), 167th (extraordinary, August 7 to August 10), 168th (extraordinary, September 10 to 2008, January 15)

Governors
Aichi Prefecture: Masaaki Kanda 
Akita Prefecture: Sukeshiro Terata 
Aomori Prefecture: Shingo Mimura
Chiba Prefecture: Akiko Dōmoto 
Ehime Prefecture: Moriyuki Kato 
Fukui Prefecture: Issei Nishikawa 
Fukuoka Prefecture: Wataru Asō 
Fukushima Prefecture: Yūhei Satō 
Gifu Prefecture: Hajime Furuta
Gunma Prefecture: Hiroyuki Kodera (until 27 July); Masaaki Osawa (starting 28 July)
Hiroshima Prefecture: Yūzan Fujita 
Hokkaido: Harumi Takahashi
Hyogo Prefecture: Toshizō Ido
Ibaraki Prefecture: Masaru Hashimoto 
Ishikawa Prefecture: Masanori Tanimoto
Iwate Prefecture: Hiroya Masuda (until 29 April); Takuya Tasso (starting 30 April)
Kagawa Prefecture: Takeki Manabe 
Kagoshima Prefecture: Satoshi Mitazono 
Kanagawa Prefecture: Shigefumi Matsuzawa 
Kochi Prefecture: Daijiro Hashimoto (until 6 December); Masanao Ozaki (starting 7 December)
Kumamoto Prefecture: Yoshiko Shiotani 
Kyoto Prefecture: Keiji Yamada 
Mie Prefecture: Akihiko Noro 
Miyagi Prefecture: Yoshihiro Murai
Miyazaki Prefecture: Kayoko Saka (until 22 January); Hideo Higashikokubaru (starting 23 January)
Nagano Prefecture: Jin Murai 
Nagasaki Prefecture: Genjirō Kaneko 
Nara Prefecture: Yoshiya Kakimoto (until 2 May); Shōgo Arai (starting 2 May)
Niigata Prefecture: Hirohiko Izumida 
Oita Prefecture: Katsusada Hirose
Okayama Prefecture: Masahiro Ishii 
Okinawa Prefecture: Hirokazu Nakaima
Osaka Prefecture: Fusae Ōta 
Saga Prefecture: Yasushi Furukawa 
Saitama Prefecture: Kiyoshi Ueda 
Shiga Prefecture: Yukiko Kada 
Shiname Prefecture: Nobuyoshi Sumita (until 29 April); Zenbe Mizoguchi (starting 30 April)
Shizuoka Prefecture: Yoshinobu Ishikawa 
Tochigi Prefecture: Tomikazu Fukuda
Tokushima Prefecture: Kamon Iizumi
Tokyo: Shintarō Ishihara 
Tottori Prefecture: Yoshihiro Katayama (until 13 April); Shinji Hirai (starting 13 April)
Toyama Prefecture: Takakazu Ishii 
Wakayama Prefecture: Yoshinobu Nisaka
Yamagata Prefecture: Hiroshi Saitō 
Yamaguchi Prefecture: Sekinari Nii 
Yamanashi Prefecture: Takahiko Yamamoto (until 16 February); Shōmei Yokouchi (starting 17 February)

Events

January
 January 23 – A rare eel-like creature identified as a frilled shark is discovered in Japan by fishermen.

February
 February 20 – A power outage strikes the central area of Nagoya.
 February 26 – A 7.0 magnitude earthquake strikes off the southern coast of Japan's Ryukyu Island.

March
 March 25 – A tsunami occurs on the northern coast of Japan after an earthquake with a magnitude of 6.9 in the Sea of Japan. NHK reports that 1 person has died and 40 have been injured.
 March 26 – Prime Minister of Japan Shinzo Abe apologizes for Japan's use of women as sex slaves in frontline brothels during World War II.

April
 April 1 – Niigata and Hamamatsu become cities designated by government ordinance.
 April 8 – Voters go to the polls in Japan for the first phase of the unified local elections including 13 gubernatorial elections, 44 prefectural assembly elections and 4 mayoral races in major cities.
 April 10 – The government of Japan extends economic sanctions against the North Korean government by an additional six months, citing a lack of progress in resolving kidnapping cases of Japanese citizens.
 April 16 – The United States, Japan and India carry out a joint naval exercise in the Pacific Ocean in an attempt to increase strategic cooperation.
 April 17 – Iccho Ito, the mayor of Nagasaki, Japan, is shot at least twice outside his re-election campaign headquarters. The assassin, Tetsuya Shiroo, is alleged to be a senior member of a local gang affiliated to the Yamaguchi-gumi crime syndicate. Itoh was taken to the Nagasaki University Hospital, where he died early the next morning due to loss of blood.
 April 22 – In the second phase of the unified local elections, hundreds of municipal elections and two by-elections for the national Diet are held.
 April 25 – Japanese police raid the offices of a pro-North Korean group in relation to the alleged kidnapping of two children in the 1970s.

May
 May 14 – The House of Councillors passes rules for revising the pacifist Constitution of Japan.
 May 28 
Riyo Mori becomes Miss Universe 2007 in Mexico City, the second Japanese to do so after Akiko Kojima.
Minister of Agriculture, Forestry and Fisheries Toshikatsu Matsuoka is found dead at his Tokyo home, hours before he was to face questions in the Diet about his expenses.

June
 June 1 – Archaeologists discover a 2,100-year-old melon in Shiga Prefecture.
 June 21 – Japan changes the name of Iwo Jima to its original name, Iwo To, to reflect the wishes of its original inhabitants.

July
 July 3 – Japan's Minister of Defense Fumio Kyuma resigns over comments he made about the atomic bombings of Hiroshima and Nagasaki on the weekend.
 July 4 – Japan's first female Minister of Defense, Yuriko Koike, is sworn in a day after the resignation of her predecessor, Fumio Kyuma.
 July 16 – 2007 Chūetsu offshore earthquake, eleven deaths and at least 1000 injuries were reported, and 342 buildings destroyed.
 July 29 – House of Councillors election

August
 August 1 – Norihiko Akagi resigns as Japan's agriculture minister after scandals involving him adversely affected the Liberal Democratic Party's performance in the 2007 Japanese House of Councillors election.
 August 24 – Murder of Rie Isogai
 August 25 – The 11th IAAF World Championships in Athletics get underway in Osaka, Japan.
 August 31 – Crypton Future Media's first Vocaloid on their Character Vocal Series, Hatsune Miku, is released for Vocaloid 2 software.

September
 September 12 – Prime Minister Shinzo Abe announces his resignation.
 September 14 – The Japan Aerospace Exploration Agency successfully launches SELENE, the largest lunar mission since the Apollo program, on a mission to explore the Moon.
 September 23 – Yasuo Fukuda, a political moderate, is elected by Japan's governing Liberal Democratic Party to become the country's next prime minister.

November
 November 18 – Japan resumes whaling of humpbacks for the first time in 40 years. Greenpeace and other environmentalist groups condemn the decision.
 November 28 – The Chinese Type 051B destroyer Shenzhen visits Tokyo in the first visit of a Chinese warship to Japan since World War II.

December
December 19 – A 32-year-old police sergeant shoots himself inside a kōban in front of Tokyo Station.

Births
August 30 – Momiji Nishiya, Olympic skateboarder

Deaths
January 5 – Momofuku Ando, inventor of Instant noodles and Cup Noodles, founder of Nissin Foods
January 8 – Iwao Takamoto, animator
April 18 – Iccho Itoh, mayor of Nagasaki
May 3 – Knock Yokoyama, comedian and politician
May 27 – Izumi Sakai, singer
May 28 – Toshikatsu Matsuoka, politician
June 28 – Kiichi Miyazawa, 78th Prime Minister
July 18 – Kenji Miyamoto, politician
August 28 – Miyoshi Umeki, actress
September 7 – Kenji Nagai, journalist (b. 1957)
October 7 – Norifumi Abe, motorcycle road racer
October 12 – Kurokawa Kisho, architect
November 13 – Kazuhisa Inao, baseball player

See also
 2007 in Japanese music
 2007 in Japanese television
 List of Japanese films of 2007

References

 
Years of the 21st century in Japan